The Two Charleys is a comedy television series which originally aired on the BBC in 1959.

Cast

Main
 Charlie Chester as  Charlie Charles
 Eleanor Summerfield as  Ethel Charles

Other
 Hugh Paddick as  Lionel Stone
 Polly Adams as Jessie
 June Cunningham as Belle
 Peggy Ann Clifford as Violet
 Danny Green as Sidney
 Wally Patch as Television mechanic
 Frederick Piper as  Mr. Ford-Hunter-Ford
Max Bacon as Syd Lomax
 Rita Webb as  Mother
 Jennifer Phipps as  Marigold
 Arnold Marlé as Blink

References

Bibliography
 Lawrence Goldman. Oxford Dictionary of National Biography 2005–2008. OUP Oxford, 2013.

External links
 

BBC television comedy
1959 British television series debuts
1959 British television series endings
1950s British comedy television series
English-language television shows